Caciomorpha robusta is a species of beetle in the family Cerambycidae. It was described by Galileo and Martins in 1998.

References

Anisocerini
Beetles described in 1998